Chlorociboria argentinensis is a  species of fungus in the family Chlorociboriaceae. It is known from Argentina.

References

External links

Helotiaceae
Fungi described in 1975
Fungi of Argentina